Tony Wadsworth  has had a lifelong career in the music industry, including stints as Managing Director of the Parlophone label, Chairman & CEO of EMI Music UK and Ireland, and Chairman of the industry's trade association, the BPI.

Biography
Having graduated in Economics at Newcastle University in 1977, he spent the next two years playing guitar in a new wave band, before working in a succession of small record labels, culminating in a short period at RCA, followed by his arrival in 1982 at EMI Records. 
 
He relaunched the legendary Parlophone label in the early 1990s, and as the label's managing director achieved notable breakthroughs with Radiohead, Blur, Pet Shop Boys and Foo Fighters, as well as worldwide hits with established stars such as Queen, Tina Turner and Paul McCartney.

In 1998 he was promoted to the role of Chairman & CEO EMI Music UK, leading all of the company's UK labels, including Capitol, EMI, Virgin, Chrysalis and Parlophone, as well as the company's recording studios Olympic, Townhouse and the Abbey Road Studios. This coincided with a period of global success with artists such as Robbie Williams, Coldplay, Kylie Minogue, Lily Allen, Norah Jones, Gorillaz, the Rolling Stones and the Beatles, amongst many others.

In 2008, after 26 years at EMI and 10 years at the top of the UK company, he stepped down soon after its acquisition by a private equity company.

Wadsworth became a Council member of the industry trade association, the BPI, in 1998, and was Chairman of the Brits annual awards show for three years from 2000–2002, during which time he established the Brits independent TV production company Brits TV. From 2007 to 2014, he held the posts of Chairman of the BPI and Chairman of Brit Awards Ltd.

Wadsworth continues to serve as a Trustee of the Brit Trust and as a Governor of the Brit School. He also holds the post of Visiting Professor in the music and business schools of the University of Newcastle upon Tyne.

He is also Chairman of Julie's Bicycle, the leading global charity bridging the gap between environmental sustainability and the creative industries.

He is a Trustee of the EMI Music Sound Foundation, a charity devoted to improving young people's access to music education and a Trustee of the EMI Archive Trust.

He is a non-executive board director of BIMM, the market leader in popular music higher education, and additionally has commercial interests ranging from ethical ticketing to a vinyl record store.

Awards
Wadsworth has an Honorary Doctorate in Music from the University of Gloucestershire.

In March 2008, he was awarded the prestigious Music Week Strat award for outstanding contribution to the UK music industry.

In 2009 he was awarded the Scott Piering Award by the Radio Academy to recognise outstanding contribution to music radio.

In June 2011, he was appointed a CBE in the Queen's Birthday Honours List for his services to the UK music industry.

References

British music industry executives
Commanders of the Order of the British Empire
Living people
Alumni of Newcastle University
Year of birth missing (living people)